The Teoponte Guerilla was an armed conflict that occurred in 1970. After the failure of Che Guevara's guerrilla, radical leftists in Bolivia began to organize again to set up guerrilla resistance, but suffered severe persecution that left many incarcerated, dead, or in exile. Despite this, radical university students in Bolivia organized a new insurgency attempt in Teoponte in 1970, trying to overcome mistakes made by Guevara's guerrilla. The participants were mostly Bolivians, but Chileans, Argentines, and Peruvians also partook. The guerrilla, which took form in an expedition into the lowlands starting from the Altiplano, lasted from July 19 to November 1 and saw most of its inexperienced participants die by attacks from the military or from disease. When Salvador Allende assumed office in Chile on November 4, his very first decree was to give asylum to the survivors.

References

Military history of South America
Conflicts in 1970
Wars involving Bolivia
1970s in Bolivia
20th-century rebellions
Guerrilla wars
Che Guevara
Communism in Bolivia
Communist rebellions
Proxy wars